Jaime López may refer to:

Jaime López (painter), Spanish painter
Jaime López (pentathlete) (born 1986), Spanish modern pentathlete
Jaime Chris López (born 1979), Mexican politician